Gajana is a small village in Jamnagar district of Gujarat, India. It is situated near the Lalpur and Lalpur is the tehsil of Gajana. There is a river near the village and its name is Mokhavati. There is one primary school in the village. The head of the village is called a Sarpanch, who is selected by people of the village by election. The Sarpanch of the village is Manjulaben Kirangiri Goswami.

Villages in Jamnagar district